André Cornélis is a 1918 French silent film directed by Georges Denola and Jean Kemm and starring Romuald Joubé, Pierre Magnier and Henry Krauss. It is based on the 1886 novel André Cornélis by Paul Bourget. Kemm subsequently directed another version also titled André Cornélis in 1927.

Plot 
Mr. Cornélis dies mysteriously after discovering that one of his friends, Mr. Termonde (Pierre Magnier) was in love with his wife. The victim's son, André Cornélis (Romuald Joubé) suffers from his mother's remarriage to Mr. Dendermonde when he is still young. To find inner peace, André begins to investigate the death of his father and ends up killing his mother's second husband.

Cast
 Romuald Joubé 
 Pierre Magnier 
 Henry Krauss 
 Paul Duc
 Marie-Louise Derval
 Mary Dorska
 Jean Kemm

References

Bibliography
 Goble, Alan. The Complete Index to Literary Sources in Film. Walter de Gruyter, 1999.

External links

1918 films
Films directed by Jean Kemm
Films directed by Georges Denola
French silent feature films
Films based on French novels
Pathé films
French black-and-white films
1910s French films